The 2020–21 Orlando Magic season was the 32nd season of the franchise in the National Basketball Association (NBA). As a result of the COVID-19 pandemic, the regular season for the league began on December 22, 2020 and featured a 72-game schedule rather than the typical 82-game schedule. The Magic missed the playoffs for the first time since the 2017–18 season. Following the season, head coach Steve Clifford and the Magic mutually agreed to part ways after three seasons with the team.

Draft picks

Roster

Standings

Division

Conference

Notes
 z – Clinched home court advantage for the entire playoffs
 c – Clinched home court advantage for the conference playoffs
 y – Clinched division title
 x – Clinched playoff spot
 pb – Clinched play-in spot
 o – Eliminated from playoff contention
 * – Division leader

Game log

Preseason 

|-style="background:#cfc;"
| 1
| December 11
| @ Atlanta
| 
| Nikola Vučević (18)
| Nikola Vučević (11)
| Aaron Gordon (6)
| State Farm Arena
| 1–0
|-style="background:#fcc;"
| 2
| December 13
| @ Atlanta
| 
| Markelle Fultz (21)
| Nikola Vučević (15)
| Michael Carter-Williams (5)
| State Farm Arena
| 1–1
|-style="background:#fcc;"
| 3
| December 17
| Charlotte
| 
| Nikola Vučević (27)
| Nikola Vučević (12)
| Markelle Fultz (6)
| Amway Center
| 1–2
|-style="background:#cfc;"
| 4
| December 19
| Charlotte
| 
| Aaron Gordon (20)
| Nikola Vučević (12)
| Anthony, Fultz (4)
| Amway Center
| 2–2

Regular season
Games were held with a limited number of fans in attendance, if any at all due to varying COVID-19 guidelines from state to state.

|- style="background:#cfc;"
| 1
| December 23
| Miami
| 
| Evan Fournier (25)
| Nikola Vučević (11)
| Cole Anthony (6)
| Amway Center3,396
| 1–0
|- style="background:#cfc;"
| 2
| December 26
| @ Washington
| 
| Terrence Ross (25)
| Nikola Vučević (17)
| Markelle Fultz (7)
| Capital One ArenaHeld without fans
| 2–0
|- style="background:#cfc;"
| 3
| December 27
| @ Washington
| 
| Fultz, Ross (26)
| Nikola Vučević (8)
| Nikola Vučević (4)
| Capital One ArenaHeld without fans
| 3–0
|- style="background:#cfc;"
| 4
| December 29
| @ Oklahoma City
| 
| Nikola Vučević (28)
| Nikola Vučević (10)
| Markelle Fultz (10)
| Chesapeake Energy ArenaHeld without fans
| 4–0
|- style="background:#fcc;"
| 5
| December 31
| Philadelphia
| 
| Nikola Vučević (19)
| Nikola Vučević (10)
| Markelle Fultz (4)
| Amway Center3,247
| 4–1

|- style="background:#fcc;"
| 6
| January 2
| Oklahoma City
| 
| Nikola Vučević (30)
| Nikola Vučević (13)
| Markelle Fultz (8)
| Amway Center3,339
| 4–2
|- style="background:#cfc;"
| 7
| January 4
| Cleveland
| 
| Aaron Gordon (24)
| Khem Birch (12)
| Markelle Fultz (8)
| Amway Center2,726
| 5–2
|- style="background:#cfc;"
| 8
| January 6
| Cleveland
| 
| Terrence Ross (20)
| Khem Birch (10)
| Nikola Vučević (6)
| Amway Center2,948
| 6–2
|- style="background:#fcc;"
| 9
| January 8
| @ Houston
| 
| Nikola Vučević (22)
| Nikola Vučević (12)
| Jordan Bone (4)
| Toyota Center3,039
| 6–3
|- style="background:#fcc;"
| 10
| January 9
| @ Dallas
| 
| Nikola Vučević (30)
| Nikola Vučević (15)
| Aaron Gordon (5)
| American Airlines CenterHeld without fans
| 6–4
|- style="background:#fcc;"
| 11
| January 11
| Milwaukee
| 
| Nikola Vučević (28)
| Nikola Vučević (13)
| Aaron Gordon (8)
| Amway Center3,248
| 6–5
|- style="background:#ccc;"
| —
| January 13
| @ Boston
| colspan="6"|Postponed due to Boston not having enough players available. Makeup date: March 21.
|- style="background:#fcc;"
| 12
| January 15
| @ Boston
| 
| Aaron Gordon (17)
| Khem Birch (12)
| Nikola Vučević (4)
| TD GardenHeld without fans
| 6–6
|- style="background:#fcc;"
| 13
| January 16
| @ Brooklyn
| 
| Nikola Vučević (34)
| Nikola Vučević (10)
| Cole Anthony (8)
| Barclays CenterHeld without fans
| 6–7
|- style="background:#fcc;"
| 14
| January 18
| @ New York
| 
| Nikola Vučević (24)
| Aaron Gordon (17)
| Aaron Gordon (9)
| Madison Square GardenHeld without fans
| 6–8
|- style="background:#cfc;"
| 15
| January 20
| @ Minnesota
| 
| Nikola Vučević (28)
| Aaron Gordon (9)
| Aaron Gordon (7)
| Target CenterHeld without fans
| 7–8
|- style="background:#fcc;"
| 16
| January 22
| @ Indiana
| 
| Evan Fournier (26)
| Nikola Vučević (12)
| Fournier, Gordon (9)
| Bankers Life FieldhouseHeld without fans
| 7–9
|- style="background:#fcc;"
| 17
| January 24
| Charlotte
| 
| Nikola Vučević (22)
| Nikola Vučević (13)
| Anthony, Fournier (6)
| Amway Center3,507
| 7–10
|- style="background:#cfc;"
| 18
| January 25
| Charlotte
| 
| Nikola Vučević (28)
| Nikola Vučević (12)
| Gordon, Vučević (7)
| Amway Center3,167
| 8–10
|- style="background:#fcc;"
| 19
| January 27
| Sacramento
| 
| Nikola Vučević (26)
| Khem Birch (14)
| Cole Anthony (6)
| Amway Center3,216
| 8–11
|- style="background:#fcc;"
| 20
| January 29
| L. A. Clippers
| 
| Terrence Ross (24)
| Clark, Gordon (7)
| Cole Anthony (6)
| Amway Center3,763
| 8–12
|- style="background:#fcc;"
| 21
| January 31
| @ Toronto
| 
| Cole Anthony (16)
| Nikola Vučević (14)
| Cole Anthony (6)
| Amalie ArenaHeld without fans
| 8–13

|- style="background:#fcc;"
| 22
| February 2
| Toronto
| 
| Fournier, Vučević (21)
| Nikola Vučević (18)
| Bone, Fournier, Vučević (4)
| Amway Center3,211
| 8–14
|- style="background:#cfc;"
| 23
| February 5
| Chicago
| 
| Nikola Vučević (43)
| Nikola Vučević (19)
| Cole Anthony (9)
| Amway Center3,535
| 9–14
|- style="background:#fcc;"
| 24
| February 6
| Chicago
| 
| Nikola Vučević (17)
| Nikola Vučević (8)
| Cole Anthony (5)
| Amway Center3,880
| 9–15
|- style="background:#fcc;"
| 25
| February 9
| @ Portland
| 
| Nikola Vučević (27)
| Nikola Vučević (15)
| Chuma Okeke (5)
| Moda CenterHeld without fans
| 9–16
|- style="background:#fcc;"
| 26
| February 11
| @ Golden State
| 
| Nikola Vučević (25)
| Nikola Vučević (13)
| Okeke, Vučević (5)
| Chase CenterHeld without fans
| 9–17
|- style="background:#cfc;"
| 27
| February 12
| @ Sacramento
| 
| Nikola Vučević (42)
| Nikola Vučević (9)
| Michael Carter-Williams (7)
| Golden 1 CenterHeld without fans
| 10–17
|- style="background:#fcc;"
| 28
| February 14
| @ Phoenix
| 
| Michael Carter-Williams (23)
| Mohamed Bamba (11)
| Terrence Ross (5)
| PHX Arena1,732
| 10–18
|- style="background:#cfc;"
| 29
| February 17
| New York
| 
| Terrence Ross (30)
| Nikola Vučević (16)
| Michael Carter-Williams (7)
| Amway Center4,249
| 11–18
|- style="background:#cfc;"
| 30
| February 19
| Golden State
| 
| Nikola Vučević (30)
| Nikola Vučević (16)
| Nikola Vučević (10)
| Amway Center4,287
| 12–18
|- style="background:#cfc;"
| 31
| February 21
| Detroit
| 
| Nikola Vučević (37)
| Nikola Vučević (12)
| Evan Fournier (7)
| Amway Center4,002
| 13–18
|- style="background:#fcc;"
| 32
| February 23
| Detroit
| 
| Nikola Vučević (20)
| Nikola Vučević (9)
| Michael Carter-Williams (5)
| Amway Center3,631
| 13–19
|- style="background:#fcc;"
| 33
| February 25
| @ Brooklyn
| 
| Nikola Vučević (28)
| Nikola Vučević (12)
| Michael Carter-Williams (5)
| Barclays Center327
| 13–20
|- style="background:#fcc;"
| 34
| February 27
| Utah
| 
| Nikola Vučević (34)
| Nikola Vučević (8)
| Carter-Williams, Randle (7)
| Amway Center4,242
| 13–21

|- style="background:#fcc;"
| 35
| March 1
| Dallas
| 
| Nikola Vučević (29)
| Nikola Vučević (15)
| Nikola Vučević (8)
| Amway Center3,766
| 13–22
|- style="background:#fcc;"
| 36
| March 3
| Atlanta
| 
| Nikola Vučević (29)
| Nikola Vučević (9)
| Michael Carter-Williams (6)
| Amway Center3,969
| 13–23
|- align="center"
|colspan="9" bgcolor="#bbcaff"|All-Star Break
|- style="background:#fcc;"
| 37
| March 11
| @ Miami
| 
| Nikola Vučević (24)
| Nikola Vučević (17)
| Michael Carter-Williams (7)
| American Airlines ArenaHeld without fans
| 13–24
|- style="background:#fcc;"
| 38
| March 12
| @ San Antonio
| 
| Nikola Vučević (26)
| Nikola Vučević (9) 
| Bacon, Carter-Williams, Randle, Vučević (3)
| AT&T CenterHeld without fans
| 13–25
|- style="background:#fcc;"
| 39
| March 14
| Miami
| 
| Nikola Vučević (38)
| Nikola Vučević (10)
| Michael Carter-Williams (7)
| Amway Center3,264
| 13–26
|- style="background:#fcc;"
| 40
| March 18
| @ New York
| 
| Evan Fournier (23)
| Nikola Vučević (16)
| Aaron Gordon (7)
| Madison Square Garden1,531
| 13–27
|- style="background:#cfc;"
| 41
| March 19
| Brooklyn
| 
| Aaron Gordon (38)
| Nikola Vučević (14)
| Nikola Vučević (8)
| Amway Center3,665
| 14–27
|- style="background:#fcc;"
| 42
| March 21
| @ Boston
| 
| Nikola Vučević (22)
| Nikola Vučević (13)
| Aaron Gordon (5)
| TD GardenHeld without fans
| 14–28
|- style="background:#fcc;"
| 43
| March 23
| Denver
| 
| Evan Fournier (31)
| Al-Farouq Aminu (10)
| Aminu, Fournier, Gordon (6)
| Amway Center3,485
| 14–29
|- style="background:#cfc;"
| 44
| March 24
| Phoenix
| 
| Nikola Vučević (27)
| Nikola Vučević (14)
| Nikola Vučević (4)
| Amway Center3,891
| 15–29
|- style="background:#fcc;"
| 45
| March 26
| Portland
| 
| Chuma Okeke (22)
| Khem Birch (15)
| Bacon, Carter-Williams (6)
| Amway Center3,827
| 15–30
|- style="background:#fcc;"
| 46
| March 28
| @ L. A. Lakers
| 
| Dwayne Bacon (26)
| Bacon, Carter Jr. (8)
| Bamba, Birch, Carter-Williams, Okeke, Randle (3)
| Staples CenterHeld without fans
| 15–31
|- style="background:#cfc;"
| 47
| March 30
| @ L. A. Clippers
| 
| Chuma Okeke (18)
| Mohamed Bamba (8)
| Michael Carter-Williams (9)
| Staples CenterHeld without fans
| 16–31

|- style="background:#cfc;"
| 48
| April 1
| @ New Orleans
| 
| Terrence Ross (19)
| Wendell Carter Jr. (12)
| Terrence Ross (5)
| Smoothie King Center3,700
| 17–31
|- style="background:#fcc;"
| 49
| April 3
| @ Utah
| 
| Wendell Carter Jr. (19)
| Wendell Carter Jr. (12)
| Okeke, Ross (3)
| Vivint Arena5,546
| 17–32
|- style="background:#fcc;"
| 50
| April 4
| @ Denver
| 
| Okeke, Ross (19)
| Wendell Carter Jr. (9)
| Ennis III, Okeke (5)
| Ball Arena3,927
| 17–33
|- style="background:#fcc;"
| 51
| April 7
| Washington
| 
| Terrence Ross (24)
| Mohamed Bamba (8)
| Cole Anthony (7)
| Amway Center3,991
| 17–34
|- style="background:#fcc;"
| 52
| April 9
| Indiana
| 
| Terrence Ross (24)
| Anthony, Carter Jr. (9)
| Chuma Okeke (7)
| Amway Center3,777
| 17–35
|- style="background:#fcc;"
| 53
| April 11
| Milwaukee
| 
| Mohamed Bamba (21)
| Anthony, Carter Jr. (8)
| Cole Anthony (5)
| Amway Center3,316
| 17–36
|- style="background:#fcc;"
| 54
| April 12
| San Antonio
| 
| R. J. Hampton (16)
| Carter Jr., Hampton (8)
| Wendell Carter Jr. (4)
| Amway Center3,107
| 17–37
|- style="background:#cfc;"
| 55
| April 14
| @ Chicago
| 
| James Ennis III (22)
| Wendell Carter Jr. (12)
| Gary Harris (6)
| United CenterHeld without fans
| 18–37
|- style="background:#fcc;"
| 56
| April 16
| @ Toronto
| 
| Wendell Carter Jr. (20)
| Wendell Carter Jr. (9)
| Cole Anthony (5)
| Amalie ArenaAttendance not reported
| 18–38
|- style="background:#fcc;"
| 57
| April 18
| Houston
| 
| Dwayne Bacon (22)
| Wendell Carter Jr. (10)
| Cole Anthony (9)
| Amway Center3,722
| 18–39
|- style="background:#fcc;"
| 58
| April 20
| @ Atlanta
| 
| Anthony, Okeke (17)
| Bamba, Carter Jr. (8)
| Cole Anthony (8)
| State Farm ArenaAttendance not reported
| 18–40
|- style="background:#fcc;"
| 59
| April 22
| New Orleans
| 
| Cannady, Bamba (17)
| Mohamed Bamba (12)
| Chasson Randle (4)
| Amway Center3,411
| 18–41
|- style="background:#fcc;"
| 60
| April 25
| Indiana
| 
| Dwayne Bacon (20)
| Wendell Carter Jr. (13)
| Cole Anthony (7)
| Amway Center3,519
| 18–42
|- style="background:#fcc;"
| 61
| April 26
| L. A. Lakers
| 
| Chuma Okeke (18)
| Wendell Carter Jr. (8)
| Cole Anthony (7)
| Amway Center4,099
| 18–43
|- style="background:#cfc;"
| 62
| April 28
| @ Cleveland
| 
| Gary Harris (19)
| James Ennis III (8)
| Gary Harris (7)
| Rocket Mortgage FieldHouse4,148
| 19–43
|- style="background:#fcc;"
| 63
| April 30
| @ Memphis
| 
| Anthony, Bamba (15)
| Bamba, Hall (11)
| Gary Harris (4)
| FedExForum2,850
| 19–44

|- style="background:#cfc;"
| 64
| May 1
| Memphis
| 
| Cole Anthony (26)
| Cole Anthony (8)
| Cole Anthony (6)
| Amway Center3,924
| 20–44
|- style="background:#cfc;"
| 65
| May 3
| @ Detroit
| 
| Mohamed Bamba (22)
| Mohamed Bamba (15)
| R. J. Hampton (10)
| Little Caesars Arena750
| 21–44
|- style="background:#fcc;"
| 66
| May 5
| Boston
| 
| Bacon, Wagner (20)
| Mohamed Bamba (15)
| R. J. Hampton (5)
| Amway Center4,249
| 21–45
|- style="background:#fcc;"
| 67
| May 7
| @ Charlotte
| 
| Dwayne Bacon (26)
| Mohamed Bamba (18)
| Chasson Randle (4)
| Spectrum Center3,751
| 21–46
|- style="background:#fcc;"
| 68
| May 9
| Minnesota
| 
| R. J. Hampton (19)
| Donta Hall (8)
| Anthony, Brazdeikis, Hampton, Thornwell (3)
| Amway Center4,086
| 21–47
|- style="background:#fcc;"
| 69
| May 11
| @ Milwaukee
| 
| Cole Anthony (18)
| Wendell Carter Jr. (14)
| R. J. Hampton (5)
| Fiserv Forum3,280
| 21–48
|- style="background:#fcc;"
| 70
| May 13
| @ Atlanta
| 
| R. J. Hampton (15)
| Wendell Carter Jr. (11)
| Cole Anthony (6)
| State Farm Arena2,910
| 21–49
|- style="background:#fcc;"
| 71
| May 14
| @ Philadelphia
| 
| Ignas Brazdeikis (21)
| R. J. Hampton (11)
| R. J. Hampton (9)
| Wells Fargo Center5,119
| 21–50
|- style="background:#fcc;"
| 72
| May 16
| @ Philadelphia
| 
| Cole Anthony (37)
| Donta Hall (10)
| Bamba, Brazdeikis (4)
| Wells Fargo Center5,119
| 21–51

Player statistics

|- align="center" bgcolor=""
| 
| 47 || 34 || 27.1 || .397 || .337 || .832 || 4.7 || 4.1 || .6 || .4 || 12.9
|- align="center" bgcolor=""
| 
| style=|72 ||style=|50 || 25.7 || .402 || .285 || .824 || 3.1 || 1.3 || .6 || .1 || 10.9
|- align="center" bgcolor=""
| 
| 46 || 5 || 15.8 || .472 || .322 || .682 || 5.8 || .8 || .3 || style=|1.3 || 8.0
|- align="center" bgcolor=""
| 
| 8 || 0 || 29.3 || .443 || .407 || .667 || 5.1 || 2.0 || .5 || .4 || 11.1
|- align="center" bgcolor=""
| 
| 22 || 19 || 26.5 || style=|.493 || .241 || .721 || style=|8.8 || 1.6 || .8 || .8 || 11.7
|- align="center" bgcolor=""
| 
| 31 || 25 || 25.8 || .389 || .246 || .613 || 4.5 || 4.2 || .8 || .5 || 8.8
|- align="center" bgcolor=""
| 
| 41 || 37 || 24.0 || .473 || style=|.433 || .805 || 4.0 || 1.5 || .8 || .2 || 8.4
|- align="center" bgcolor=""
| 
| 8 || 8 || 26.9 || .394 || .250 || .895 || 3.1 || style=|5.4 || 1.0 || .3 || 12.9
|- align="center" bgcolor=""
| 
| 26 || 1 || 25.2 || .439 || .319 || .657 || 5.0 || 2.8 || .6 || .3 || 11.2
|- align="center" bgcolor=""
| 
| 20 || 19 || 25.0 || .365 || .364 || .875 || 1.6 || 2.3 || .6 || .4 || 10.2
|- align="center" bgcolor=""
| 
| 45 || 19 || 25.2 || .417 || .348 || .750 || 4.0 || 2.2 || 1.1 || .5 || 7.8
|- align="center" bgcolor=""
| 
| 3 || 0 || 22.0 || .360 || .111 || style=|1.000 || 4.7 || 1.7 || style=|1.3 || .0 || 8.0
|- align="center" bgcolor=""
| 
| 41 || 5 || 20.4 || .388 || .338 || .792 || 2.0 || 1.8 || .5 || .1 || 6.5
|- align="center" bgcolor=""
| 
| 46 || 2 || 29.3 || .412 || .337 || .870 || 3.4 || 2.3 || 1.0 || .5 || style=|15.6
|- align="center" bgcolor=""
| 
| 7 || 0 || 20.6 || .320 || .286 || .667 || 1.9 || 2.4 || 1.1 || .1 || 3.4
|- align="center" bgcolor=""
| 
| 11 || 10 || 26.0 || .409 || .372 || .879 || 4.9 || 1.1 || .4 || .8 || 11.0
|}
Player Statistics Citation:

Awards and honors

Notes

References

Orlando Magic seasons
Orlando Magic
Orlando Magic
Orlando Magic